Marshal Admiral Baron  was a Meiji-period career officer in the Imperial Japanese Navy.

Life and career
Born in what is now part of Kagoshima city, as the son of a samurai retainer of Satsuma domain, he fought as a Satsuma samurai and foot soldier during major actions in the Boshin War (1868) against the forces loyal to the Tokugawa Shogunate. 

After the Meiji Restoration and the establishment of the new Meiji government, Ijūin moved to Tokyo and entered the 4th class of the Imperial Japanese Naval Academy (1871), and as cadet served on vessels of the early Imperial Japanese Navy. He participated in the Taiwan Expedition (1874), the Ganghwa Island incident off Korea (1875), and the Satsuma Rebellion (1877). 

Sent to England for study in 1877, Ijūin completed courses at Royal Naval College, Greenwich and was commissioned a sub-lieutenant on 27 November 1883. Promoted to lieutenant on 20 June 1885, he returned to work on the Imperial Japanese Navy General Staff (1886–99). He was promoted to lieutenant-commander on 16 October 1890 and received a double promotion to captain on 7 December 1894. During the First Sino-Japanese War he served as a staff officer at the Imperial Japanese Navy headquarters. He became a close confidant of navy chief Admiral Yamamoto Gonnohyoe, and was an important planner and specialist in naval technology. 

Promoted to rear admiral on 26 September 1899, Ijūin was a strong proponent of better relations between Japan and the United Kingdom, and worked to develop the Anglo-Japanese Alliance (1902) from behind the scenes. He was on a diplomatic mission to the United Kingdom in 1902 with Major-General Fukushima Yasumasa, and was awarded an honorary Knight Commander of the Order of the Bath (KCB). He was promoted to vice-admiral on 5 September 1903. As an engineer, he also developed the "Ijūin Fuse," making use of the newly developed Shimose powder, which was successfully used in heavy naval artillery shells during Russo-Japanese War (1904–05). 

Ijūin became Vice-Chief of the Navy General Staff during the Russo-Japanese War, successively assumed the positions of commander-in-chief of the IJN 2nd Fleet, the IJN 1st Fleet, the Combined Fleet, and then became Chief of the Imperial Japanese Navy General Staff (1909–14). 

Ijūin was elevated to the title of danshaku (baron) in 1907 under the kazoku peerage system, became an admiral on 1 December 1910 and marshal-admiral on 26 May 1915, despite never having actually commanded a ship.

His grave is at Aoyama Cemetery in Tokyo. His son, the Admiral Ijūin Matsuji, also a career navy officer, perished in World War II during the Battle of Saipan in 1944. His second son Takeji Ohno was 4th captain of the battleship Yamato.

Notes

References

External links

1853 births
1921 deaths
People from Satsuma Domain
Boshin War
Imperial Japanese Navy marshal admirals
People of Meiji-period Japan
People of the Boshin War
Japanese military personnel of the First Sino-Japanese War
Japanese military personnel of the Russo-Japanese War
Samurai
Kazoku
Shimazu retainers
Recipients of the Order of the Golden Kite
People from Kagoshima
Recipients of the Order of the Plum Blossom